The following is an incomplete list of association football clubs based in Namibia.
For a complete list see :Category:Football clubs in Namibia

Hope Soccer Academy (Helao Nafidi, Oshikango)

A
African Stars (Windhoek)
 Atlanta Bucks F.C (Luderitz)

B
Black Africa F.C. (Windhoek)
Blue Boys F.C. (Swakopmund)
Blue Waters (Walvis Bay)

E
Eleven Arrows (Walvis Bay)

F
FC Civics (Windhoek)

K
KK Palace

M
Mighty Gunners F.C. (Otjiwarongo)

O
Orlando Pirates (Windhoek) 
Oshakati City FC (Oshakati)
Oshikango chiefs (Helao Nafidi, Oshikango)

R
Ramblers (Windhoek)

S
SK Windhoek (Windhoek)
Swakopmund FC (Swakopmund)
Satoka United (Rundu, Kasote)

T
Tura Magic F.C.

U
United Africa Tigers (Windhoek)
United Stars

Namibia
Football
Football clubs